Plagioscutum is an extinct genus of Middle Triassic temnospondyl amphibian from the Ladinian Inder Formation of Kazakhstan and the Anisian Donguz Formation of Russia.

See also 
 Prehistoric amphibian
 List of prehistoric amphibians

References 

Plagiosauridae
Anisian genera
Ladinian genera
Triassic temnospondyls
Triassic Kazakhstan
Fossils of Kazakhstan
Triassic Russia
Fossils of Russia
Fossil taxa described in 1986